Brian Albert Wrobel (born April 4, 1982) is a former American football quarterback. He was signed by the Seattle Seahawks as an undrafted free agent in 2005. He played college football at Winona State.

Wrobel was also a member of the Berlin Thunder, Green Bay Packers and Rhein Fire.

Early years
Wrobel was a three-sport letterwinner at DeSoto High School, where he played football, basketball and baseball.

Professional career

Seattle Seahawks
Wrobel was not drafted and was signed as an undrafted free agent with the Seattle Seahawks.

Green Bay Packers
Wrobel was signed by the Green Bay Packers on January 1, 2006. He was released by the Packers on August 29, 2006.

Berlin Thunder
Wrobel was allocated to the Berlin Thunder for the 2006 NFL Europa season. In a reserve role, he completed 28 of 60 passes for 293 yards and one touchdown and also rushed 16 times for 42 yards and a touchdown.

Coaching career
Wrobel now coaches quarterbacks at the University of Wisconsin La Crosse.

1982 births
Living people
Winona State Warriors football players
Sportspeople from La Crosse, Wisconsin
American football quarterbacks
Green Bay Packers players
Berlin Thunder players
Rhein Fire players
American people of Polish descent